Ana Birchall (née Ana Călin; born. August 30, 1973) is a Romanian lawyer and politician. Since 2012, Birchall has served Chamber of Deputies for Vaslui County representing the Social Democratic Party. In the Victor Ponta and Sorin Grindeanu Cabinets, Brichall served as the Prime Minister's representative for European affairs and the partnership with the United States. After the resignation of Florin Iordache following anti-corruption protests, Birchall served as Minister of Justice, first on an interim basis and later permanently in the Cabinet of Viorica Dăncilă. Between 2019-2019 Ana Birchall was Deputy Prime Minister in charge with the Strategic Partnerships of Romania. 

On November 12, 2019, Birchall was expelled from the PSD and as Minister of Justice due to her refusal to support the toxic proposals  of PSD in the legal and justice system. By doing so, Birchall saved Romania from a possible activation of art. 7 of EU Treaty and defended the rule of law and the anti corruption laws.

Biography 
Ana Birchall was born on August 30, 1973 in Mizil and grew up in Fulga, Prahova County.

Birchall received her bachelor's degree in law and received her master's degree from Yale Law School in the United States specializing in bankruptcy law and International financial law. Birchall graduated from Yale magna cum laude.

Birchall continued her studies at Yale Law and pursued her Juris Doctor under Anthony T. Kronman. Her doctorate thesis was a comparative analysis of bankruptcy law between the United States, the United Kingdom, France, Germany, Romania, Hungary, Poland and the Czech Republic.

After her doctorate studies, Birchall worked as a lawyer on Wall Street in New York for legal firm White & Case, Her clients included ENRON, MCI-Worldcom, United Airlines, US Airways and UPC.

In 2003, Birchall decided to return to Romania and enter the political sphere. Birchall began her career internally within the Social Democrats, serving as an advisor to the Minister of External Affairs and later as head of equal opportunities in the party, head of education and research for the party, and as the spokesperson for the local Bucharest wing of the party.

Birchall also continued her legal career as a member of the Bucharest Bar and continued her work with White & Case LLP

In 1998, Birchall married British businessman Martyn Birchall. The two had a son, Andrew in 2001. They live in Bucharest.

In January 2017, Birchall was appointed Minister for Europe and, in 2019, she was preparing for Romania’s presidency of the EU Council. Following the widespread public protest in early 2017, she was appointed Interim Minister of Justice  and succeeded in restoring public regard for the justice system and the Ministry of Justice. Her actions at the Ministry of Justice incurred the wrath of corrupt vested interests, which led her to be forced out of the government in June, 2017.
In January 2018, Birchall was appointed Deputy Prime Minister  with responsibility of Strategic Partnerships and successfully advanced relations with several countries. From April 2019, she resumed her post as Interim Minister of Justice during a time of concern with regard to the course of judicial reform and the fight against corruption. Afterwards, in May 2019, she assumed the responsibility of Minister of Justice and advanced judicial reform in the face of concerted attempts by multiple vested groups to disrupt progress. 
During 2020, she managed to guide parliamentary legislation that for the first time effectively addressed the recovery of assets gained as the proceeds of crime.

As of May 2022, she serves as the Special Envoy for Strategic and International Affairs at Nuclearelectrica, the Romanian nuclear power energy company.

Defamation and false cases 
In May 2008, a legal application for divorce was submitted under Birchall's name in Bucharest's First District Court. Birchall, who found out about the application from the press, submitted a request to cancel the application. Birchall later proved that the application was not hers, and that the signature was different than her own. Birchall accused political opponents of trying to discredit her ahead of local and parliamentary elections, as her name was being circulated as a future minister of education.

In September 2008, in the middle of the election campaign, Birchall faced another scandal. Iosif Buble of Antena 1 released a 34-second video on the internet which purported to show a woman similar to Birchall in intimate poses with an unknown man. Birchall vehemently denied the allegations, and brought out a forensic expert who said that the a person in the video was physically different than her. Cancan magazine apologized to Birchall and her family for the story and retracted their claims about Birchall's appearance in the film.

Birchall sued Iosif Buble in court, alleging that it was part of a campaign of denigration and defamation against her political career. The court ruled in favor of Birchall in both the first instance and the appeal.

References

Bibliography 
 Andreea Țuligă, „M-am trezit cu câteva SMS-uri «deocheate»”, Evenimentul zilei, 10 august 2008

External links 
 Personal site: „Activitatea profesională” , „Despre mine” , blog
 en  White & Case, Ana Birchall 
 „M-am trezit cu câteva SMS-uri «deocheate»“, 10 august 2008, Andreea Țuligă, Evenimentul zilei

1973 births
People from Mizil
Romanian Ministers of Justice
Social Democratic Party (Romania) politicians
Women members of the Romanian Cabinet
21st-century Romanian women politicians
21st-century Romanian politicians
Romanian women lawyers
Members of the Chamber of Deputies (Romania)
Yale Law School alumni
University of Bucharest alumni
Living people